Miamira alleni is a species of colorful sea slug, a dorid nudibranch, a shell-less marine gastropod mollusk in the family Chromodorididae.

Distribution
This species is found in shallow reefs in Southeast Asia.

Ecology
M. alleni has not been observed eating, but it is likely that it consumes sponges, like other Miamira  species.

References

External links
 

Chromodorididae
Gastropods described in 1996